Wilfrid Rall (August 29, 1922 - April 1, 2018) was a neuroscientist who spent most of his career at the National Institutes of Health.  He is considered one of the founders of computational neuroscience, and was a pioneer in establishing the integrative functions of neuronal dendrites. Rall developed the use of cable theory in neuroscience, as well as passive and active compartmental modeling of the neuron.

Rall studied physics at Yale University, from which he graduated with highest honors in 1943, and where he was Chairman of the Yale Political Union's Labor Party. He was involved with the Manhattan Project at the University of Chicago during the war, and subsequently worked with K.S. Cole at Woods Hole. He then moved to the University of Otago in Dunedin to work with John Carew Eccles for his PhD, and remained there after Eccles' departure for Australia. In 1954, he spent a sabbatical year at University College London in the Biophysics Department headed by Bernard Katz, and after a final year in Dunedin (where he was Acting Head of Department) he then moved to Bethesda, Maryland and the National Institutes of Health, where he remained until his retirement in 1994.

Scientific focus 
Wilfrid Rall's scientific achievements concern the electrical properties of neurons, and in particular the excitability of dendrites.

Rall's work has led to a number of major conceptual breakthroughs, including the following:
 the application of cable theory to single neurons (Rall 1957, 1959, 1960)
 the first theoretical exploration of active dendrites (Rall and Shepherd, 1968)
 the first theoretical exploration of active spines (Rall 1974; Miller, Rall and Rinzel, 1985)''

See also 
 Cable theory

Notes

References 
  Rall W. (1955a) A statistical theory of monosynaptic input-output relations. J. Cell. Comp. Physiol. 46: 373-411.
 Rall W. (1955b) Experimental monosynaptic input-output relations in the mammalian spinal cord. J. Cell. Comp. Physiol. 46: 413-437.
 Rall W. (1957) Membrane time constant of motoneurons. Science 126: 454.
 Rall W. (1959) Branching dendritic trees and motoneuron membrane resistivity. Exp. Neurol. 1: 491-527.
 Rall W. (1960) Membrane potential transients and membrane time constant of motoneurons. Exp. Neurol. 2: 503-532.
 Rall, W. (1962) Theory of physiological properties of dendrites. Ann. N.Y. Acad. Sci. 96: 1071-1092.
 Rall, W. (1964) Theoretical significance of dendritic trees for neuronal input-output relations. In Neural Theory and Modeling, ed. R.F. Reiss. Stanford Univ. Press.
 Rall, W., G.M. Shepherd, T.S. Reese, and M.W. Brightman. (1966) Dendro-dendritic synaptic pathway for inhibition in the olfactory bulb. Exptl. Neurol. 14:44-56.

External links 
 The Theoretical Foundations of Dendritic Function: The Collected Papers of Wilfrid Rall with Commentaries
 Washington Post obituary 
Wilfrid Rall computational neuroscience research collection, Medical Historical Library, Harvey Cushing/John Hay Whitney Medical Library, Yale University. 
Wilfrid Rall Archive: Pioneer of Dendritic Function and Computational Neuroscience. 

American neuroscientists
1922 births
2018 deaths
Writers from Los Angeles
University of Otago alumni
Academic staff of the University of Otago
Yale University alumni
Manhattan Project people
University of Chicago staff
American expatriates in New Zealand
American expatriates in the United Kingdom